West Creek Lake is a lake located south of Hoffmeister, New York. Fish species present in the lake are brook trout, and sunfish. There is a trail access to the lake.

References

Lakes of New York (state)
Lakes of Hamilton County, New York